Carlo Taranto (18 October 1921 – 4 April 1986) was an Italian film actor. He appeared in 50 films between 1949 and 1984.

Partial filmography

 The Firemen of Viggiù (1949)
 Assi alla ribalta (1954)
 Wives and Obscurities (1956) - aiutante di Carmine
 Doctor and the Healer (1957) - Scaraffone
 Primo applauso (1957)
 I prepotenti (1958) - Numa
 Carmela è una bambola (1958) - Pasqualino
 Sorrisi e canzoni (1958)
 Ricordati di Napoli (1958) - Domenichino
 Avventura a Capri (1959) - Giovane operaio in piazzetta
 Lui, lei e il nonno (1959)
 La cento chilometri (1959) - Righetto
 La nipote Sabella (1959) - The Porter in Salerno Railway Station
 Nel blu dipinto di blu (1959) - Remo
 Cerasella (1959) - Suanatore di mandolino
 Some Like It Cold (1960) - Cesarino
 Appuntamento a Ischia (1960) - Gennaro
 Caravan petrol (1960) - The Head of the Execution Squad
 Akiko em Roma (1961)
 The Last Judgment (1961)
 Don Camillo: Monsignor (1961) - Marasca, il marito di Gisella
 Pesci d'oro e bikini d'argento (1961) - Secondo ladro
 The Italian Brigands (1961) - O Scaraffone
 Che femmina!! E... che dollari! (1961)
 Toto vs. Maciste (1962) - Consigliere Assiro
 The Four Monks (1962) - Il mafioso
 Divorzio alla siciliana (1963)
 In ginocchio da te (1964) - Serg. Scannapietra
 Made in Italy (1965) - Office Employee (segment "4 'Cittadini, stato e chiesa', episode 1")
 Te lo leggo negli occhi (1965)
 Non son degno di te (1965) - Scannapieco
 How We Robbed the Bank of Italy (1966) - Pasquale
 Dio, come ti amo! (1966) - Taxi Driver
 Perdono (1966) - Carlo
 Nessuno mi può giudicare (1966) - Carlo
 7 monaci d'oro (1966) - Pasquale Volterra, detto 'Vesuvio'
 Tears on Your Face (1967) - Chitarrista
 Nel sole (1967) - Giacomo
 Il ragazzo che sapeva amare (1967)
 L'oro del mondo (1968) - Cessionario
 Chimera (1968) - Roberto Mendoza
 The Nephews of Zorro (1968) - Cleptomane
 Operazione ricchezza (1968)
 Il ragazzo che sorride (1969) - Little hotel owner
 Il suo nome è Donna Rosa (1969) - Francesco - the butler
 Lisa dagli occhi blu (1970) - Inspector's helper
 Mezzanotte d'amore (1970) - Francesco - the butler
 The President of Borgorosso Football Club (1970) - The South American Coach
 Figlio mio, sono innocente! (1978) - Don Pasquale
 Neapolitan Mystery (1979)
 Where's Picone? (1984) - Gannina
 Al limite, cioè, non glielo dico (1985)

References

External links

1921 births
1986 deaths
Italian male film actors
20th-century Italian male actors